Mark Alexander (February 7, 1792 – October 7, 1883) was a nineteenth-century slave owner, lawyer and political figure from Virginia.

Biography
Born on a plantation near Boydton, Virginia, Alexander attended the public schools as a child and graduated from the University of North Carolina in 1811. He studied law and was admitted to the bar, commencing practice in Boydton. He was a member of the Virginia House of Delegates from 1815 to 1819 before he was elected a Democratic-Republican, Crawford Republican and Jacksonian to the United States House of Representatives in 1818, serving from 1819 to 1833. There, Alexander served as chairman of the Committee on the District of Columbia from 1825 to 1829. After declining renomination in 1832, he was a delegate to the Virginia Constitutional Convention from 1829 to 1830 and was again a member of the House of Delegates from 1845 to 1846. Alexander then retired from political life and engaged in managing his large plantation until his death in Scotland Neck, North Carolina on October 7, 1883. He was interred in Episcopal Church Cemetery in Scotland Neck.

He owned a plantation that had, depending on estimates, between 30 and 100 slaves.

Elections
1823; Alexander was elected to the U.S. House of Representatives unopposed.
1825; Alexander was re-elected unopposed.
1827; Alexander was re-elected unopposed.
1829; Alexander was re-elected unopposed.
1831; Alexander was re-elected unopposed.

References

External links

1792 births
1883 deaths
Members of the Virginia House of Delegates
Virginia lawyers
University of North Carolina at Chapel Hill alumni
People from Boydton, Virginia
Democratic-Republican Party members of the United States House of Representatives from Virginia
Jacksonian members of the United States House of Representatives from Virginia
19th-century American politicians
19th-century American lawyers
Burials in North Carolina